Georgia Hard is the sixth studio album by the American country musician Robbie Fulks, released on May 17, 2005 on Yep Roc Records.

Critical reception
Georgia Hard received mainly favorable reviews from critics. For instance, Robert Christgau gave it an A−, and later ranked it #38 on his 2005 Pazz & Jop list. PopMatters also named it the 4th best country album of the year, and CMT's Edward Morris named it one of his ten favorite country albums of the year.

Track listing
	Where There's A Road – 	3:54
	It's Always Raining Somewhere – 3:17
	Leave It To A Loser – 3:28
	Georgia Hard – 4:14
	I'm Gonna Take You Home (And Make You Like Me) – 3:01	
	Coldwater, Tennessee – 5:13	
	All You Can Cheat – 2:50
	Countrier Than Thou – 3:25	
	If They Could Only See Me Now – 4:26
	I Never Did Like Planes – 3:29	
	Each Night I Try – 3:10	
	Doin' Right (For All The Wrong Reasons) – 4:24	
	You Don't Want What I Have – 5:43	
	Right On Redd – 3:30	
	Goodbye, Cruel Girl – 3:11

References

Robbie Fulks albums
Yep Roc Records albums
2005 albums